The name Caitlin has been used for two tropical cyclones in the western Pacific Ocean.

 Typhoon Caitlin (1991), caused heavy rainfall in the Philippines before turning north and passing through the Korea Strait.
 Tropical Storm Caitlin (1994), struck Taiwan then proceeded west into mainland China.

Pacific typhoon set index articles